Torrance Skeete (17 May 1852 – 5 July 1945) was a Barbadian cricketer. He played in four first-class matches for the Barbados cricket team from 1871 to 1888.

See also
 List of Barbadian representative cricketers

References

External links
 

1852 births
1945 deaths
Barbadian cricketers
Barbados cricketers
People from Saint Philip, Barbados